The 2020 Burgenland state election was held on 26 January 2020 to elect the members of the 22nd Landtag of Burgenland. The snap election was called in the wake of the Ibiza affair in May 2019, which caused the Social Democratic Party of Austria (SPÖ) to terminate its coalition with the Freedom Party of Austria (FPÖ).

The centre-left SPÖ achieved its best result since 2005, winning an absolute majority on a swing of eight percentage points. The conservative Austrian People's Party (ÖVP) improved on its 2015 result, but did not gain any seats. The FPÖ lost a third of its votes, falling to 9.8% and four seats. The Greens stayed level, while List Burgenland (LBL) lost most of its votes and both of its seats. The net result was a shift of four seats to the SPÖ.

The SPÖ's unexpectedly strong result came after a string of election losses since 2017, including its worst-ever result in the 2019 federal election result three months earlier. Commentators attributed this to the conservative positions on immigration and national security taken by Governor Hans Peter Doskozil. Burgenland is a traditional stronghold of the SPÖ, who have governed the state continuously since 1964.

Due to its Landtag majority, the SPÖ did not seek a coalition partner, and entered government alone. Doskozil was sworn in as Governor for a second term on 17 February. Fellow SPÖ member Astrid Eisenkopf became Deputy Governor, the first woman to hold the position in Burgenland.

Electoral system

The 36 seats of the Landtag of Burgenland are elected via open list proportional representation in a two-step process. The seats are distributed between seven multi-member constituencies, corresponding to the seven districts of Burgenland (the statutory cities of Eisenstadt and Rust are combined with Eisenstadt-Umgebung District). Apportionment of the seats is based on the results of the most recent census.

For parties to receive any representation in the Landtag, they must either win at least one seat in a constituency directly, or clear a 4 percent state-wide electoral threshold. Seats are distributed in constituencies according to the Hare quota, with any remaining seats allocated using the D'Hondt method at the state level, to ensure overall proportionality between a party's vote share and its share of seats.

In addition to voting for a political party, voters may cast preferential votes for specific candidates of that party, but are not required to do so. These additional votes do not affect the proportional allocation based on the vote for the party or list, but can change the rank order of candidates on a party's lists at the state and constituency level. Voters may cast one preferential vote at the state level, or three at the constituency level. A voter may not cross party-lines to cast a preference vote for a candidate of another party; such preference votes are invalid.

Contesting parties

Opinion polling

Results

Results by constituency

Preference votes
Alongside votes for a party, voters were able to cast a preferential votes for a candidate on the party list. The ten candidates with the most preferential votes on a state level were as follows:

References

2020 elections in Austria
History of Burgenland
State elections in Austria
2020 in Austria